Teat(r)o Oficina Uzyna Uzona or simply Teatro Oficina (English: Theater Workshop), is a theater company in Brazil, located in São Paulo in the neighborhood of Bixiga. It was founded in 1958 at the Faculty of Law of the University of São Paulo by Amir Haddad, José Celso Martinez Correa, Carlos Queiroz Telles and Ron Daniels.

History

The Teatro Oficina brought together great artists who have passed on their stages throughout their decades of existence, such as Etty Fraser, Maria Alice Vergueiro (Tapa na Pantera), and Leona Cavalli.

The theater was home to much of the international scenic experience, which it brought together from Bertolt Brecht, Jean-Paul Sartre to the Living Theater. It was in Teatro Oficina that an important manifesto of Brazilian culture, Tropicalismo, a 1960s version of the anthropophagic movement of Oswald de Andrade, originated, influencing  musicians, poets and other artists. The company's productions drew influence from Greek drama.

In 1967, Oficina staged de Andrade's play O rei da vela, performed by Renato Borghi, along with Itala Nandi and Fernando Peixoto. According to Renato Borghi "The bombastic dramaturgy made me feel acting within the roots and the Brazilian soul, in this play, Oswald de Andrade spoke of Brazil in an Anthropophagic Movement way, devouring what people had of good and of bad. Brazil on all sides, devoured him and then spit on the stage, and I signed down, blood, sweat and tears...".

Currently the company is directed by José Celso Martinez Corrêa, also known as simply Zé Celso.

References

External links
Official website (in Portuguese)

Theatres in São Paulo